The 1946 NCAA Men's Division I Basketball Championship Game took place on March 26, 1946 between the North Carolina Tar Heels and Oklahoma A&M Aggies at Madison Square Garden in New York City, New York. The match-up was the final one of the eighth consecutive NCAA Men's Division I Basketball Championship single-elimination tournament — commonly referred to as the NCAA Tournament — organized by the National Collegiate Athletic Association (NCAA) and is used to crown a national champion for men's basketball at the Division I level.

The Aggie won their second consecutive NCAA Men's Basketball National Championship. Bob Kurland was named the NCAA basketball tournament Most Outstanding Player for his efforts throughout the tournament, an honor which he won in the previous year's tournament.

Background

North Carolina Tar Heels

The North Carolina Tar Heels, or White Phantoms, entered the season being coached by Ben Carnevale.

Oklahoma A&M Aggies

Coach Henry Iba and the Oklahoma A&M Aggies won the national championship game the previous season, where they defeated New York University by four points to claim the national title. The team returned most of the roster from the year before and the team was expected to be successful as the prior year. Sam Aubrey, a player who enlisted in 1943 and was deployed in World War II, returned to the team. Aubrey had sustained an injury during combat, but after intense rehab, he returned to the level of play he had been at before he left and was placed in the starting line up. The Aggies finished the regular season with a 28-2 record and won the Missouri Valley Conference. All five starters for the Aggies were named first team all-conference.

Media coverage

The media believed that the Aggies' chances of winning depended on the play of Bob Kurland, the nation's leading scorer. An Associated Press writer believed that if Kurland played like he had in the past eleven games, then the Aggies would be the first team to repeat as NCAA champions. Sportswriters believed that if McKinney – who was assigned to guard Kurland – could play well enough defense and Dillon make enough shots, the Tar Heels would have a chance at winning.

Broadcast

This was the first NCAA Tournament to have a game televised. The game was broadcast across only the greater New York area and reached close to 500,000 people.

Box score

Source:

References

Citations

Bibliography

NCAA Basketball Championship Game
NCAA Division I Men's Basketball Championship Games
North Carolina Tar Heels men's basketball
Oklahoma State Cowboys basketball
Basketball in New York City
College sports in New York City
Sports competitions in New York City
NCAA Basketball Championship Game
NCAA Basketball Championship Game
1940s in Manhattan
Madison Square Garden